Omiodes decisalis is a moth in the family Crambidae. It was described by Francis Walker in 1866. It is found in Indonesia (Java), Japan, China and Australia.

References

Moths described in 1866
decisalis